Nakamura Chiyo (1906 – 1969) was a Japanese writer of Nivkh origin.

She was born in Sakhalin. She married Wysk Wonη (ウシク・ウーヌ). In 1947, she and her husband were repatriated to Hokkaido. After that, she lived in Iwanai for 2 years and moved to Abashiri. 

Her main works are "Gilliak's Old Story"().

See also
 Nivkh people

References 

Nivkh
Japanese writers
1906 births
1969 deaths